Ernest Ross Smith (born 24 January 1938) is a former Australian politician. He was the Liberal member for Glen Waverley in the Victorian Legislative Assembly from 1985 to 2002.

Personal life 
Smith was born in Southport, Queensland, to Allen and Leila Smith. He attended Fort Street Boys' High School and Balmain Teachers' College (both in Sydney) from which he graduated in 1956. He married Patricia Moxham and had their first daughter, Alexina. A year later they had their second daughter, Jann and they had their last child, Sarah in 1969. Patricia and Ross divorced and Ross married Sarah Spencer. Sarah Spencer is English and had two sons prior to their marriage, Richard and James. A few years after their marriage, Ross and Sarah had their first and only child, Harriet, in 1991.

Professional life 
Ross taught at Tarcutta Primary School and Albury High School, both in New South Wales, from 1957 to 1959 before working at the Immigration Department at Australia House in London in 1960. In 1961 he became a journalist, writing for the Daily Telegraph and the Sydney Sun. In 1964 he enlisted in the army and served two tours of duty in Vietnam. He later rose to the rank of lieutenant colonel. In 1964 he also joined the Liberal Party.

Smith left the army in 1984, and in 1985 was elected to the Victorian Legislative Assembly as the Liberal member for the new seat of  Glen Waverley. He became Government Whip in 1996, and Opposition Whip in 1999 when the Coalition lost government. He retired in 2002, when his seat was abolished.

References

1938 births
Living people
Liberal Party of Australia members of the Parliament of Victoria
Members of the Victorian Legislative Assembly
21st-century Australian politicians
Australian schoolteachers
Military personnel from New South Wales
New South Wales politicians
People from the Gold Coast, Queensland
Australian Army officers
Australian military personnel of the Vietnam War
20th-century Australian politicians